Karabash is an urban locality (an urban-type settlement) in Bugulminsky District of the Republic of Tatarstan, Russia, located at the confluence of the Zay and Stepnoy Zay Rivers,  northwest of Bugulma, the administrative center of the district. As of the 2010 Census, its population was 5,005.

History
It has been known since 1664 and was granted urban-type settlement status in 1957.

Administrative and municipal status
Within the framework of administrative divisions, the urban-type settlement of Karabash is subordinated to Bugulminsky District. As a municipal division, Karabash, together with one rural locality (the village of Irken), is incorporated within Bugulminsky Municipal District as Karabash Urban Settlement.

Economy and infrastructure
As of 1997, Irkenneft oil company was the main industrial enterprise in the settlement. Other facilities included a secondary school and a mosque. The Karabash Reservoir is located in the vicinity.

Demographics

In 1989, ethnic Tatars accounted for 80.1% of the population, followed by the Russians at 14.1%, Chuvash at 2.3%, and Mordvins at 1.4%.

References

Notes

Sources

Urban-type settlements in the Republic of Tatarstan
Bugulminsky Uyezd